Makemo Airport  is an airport on Makemo in French Polynesia. The airport is  WNW of the village of Pouheva.

Airlines and destinations

Passenger

Statistics

References

External links

Airports in French Polynesia